Michalis Kyrgias (born 14 October 1989) is a Greek professional footballer who plays as a centre back for Super League 2 club Kallithea.

Career
Kyrgias started his career in youth teams of Atromitos Athens and made his professional debut in 2009, playing for Apollon Smyrnis, being a member of Greek U19 national team. In June 2013 he was transferred to Aris Thessaloniki.

References

External links
 
Myplayer.gr Profile

1989 births
Living people
Greece youth international footballers
Super League Greece players
Ilioupoli F.C. players
Apollon Smyrnis F.C. players
Aris Thessaloniki F.C. players
Ionikos F.C. players
Association football central defenders
Footballers from Athens
Greek footballers